Anne L'Huillier (born 1958 in Paris) is a French physicist, and professor of atomic physics at Lund University in Sweden.

Life
L'Huillier first pursued an education and was awarded a Master of Science in theoretical physics and mathematics, but switched for her PhD to experimental physics at the French nuclear research center of the Commissariat à l'énergie atomique et aux énergies alternatives in Saclay Nuclear Research Centre. Her dissertation was on multiple ionization in laser fields of high intensity.

As a post-doctoral student, she was in Gothenburg, Sweden and Los Angeles, California, United States. From 1986, she was permanently employed at the Saclay Nuclear Research Centre. In 1992, she took part in an experiment in Lund, where one of the first titanium-sapphire solid-state laser systems for femtosecond pulses in Europe had been installed. In 1994 she moved  to Sweden, where she served at Lund University as a lecturer in 1995 and a professor in 1997.

She leads an attosecond physics group which studies the movements of electrons in real time, which is used to understand the chemical reactions on the atomic level. In 2003 she and her group beat the world record with the smallest laser pulse of 170 attoseconds. 
 
L'Huillier was on the Nobel Committee for Physics between 2007 and 2015, and has been a member of the Swedish Academy of Sciences since 2004. In 2003, she received the Julius Springer Prize. In 2011 she received a UNESCO L'Oréal Award. She was elected a foreign associate of the National Academy of Sciences in 2018. One year later, in 2019, she was recognized with the Prize for Fundamental Aspects of Quantum Electronics and Optics, announced by the European Physical Society. Anne L'Huillier is a fellow member of the American Physical Society and the Optical Society.

In 2021 L'Huillier was awarded the Optical Society of America Max Born Award for "pioneering work in ultrafast laser science and attosecond physics, realizing and understanding high harmonic generation and applying it to time-resolved imaging of electron motion in atoms and molecules". In 2022 she received the Wolf Prize in Physics for "pioneering contributions to ultrafast laser science and attosecond physics". Also for 2022 she was awarded the BBVA Foundation Frontiers of Knowledge Award in Basic Sciences.

Works

References

External links

1958 births
Living people
Scientists from Paris
Academic staff of Lund University
French physicists
L'Oréal-UNESCO Awards for Women in Science laureates
Foreign associates of the National Academy of Sciences
Fellows of Optica (society)
Women in optics
Fellows of the American Physical Society
French women physicists